Mahāgandhāyon Monastery is a monastic college located in Amarapura, Myanmar. The monastery is known for its strict adherence to the Vinaya, the Buddhist monastic code.

History 
The monastery was first established by Agatithuka Sayadaw, a Thudhamma-affiliated monk around 1908, as a meditation monastery for forest-dwelling monks. The monastery gained further prominence under the leadership of Ashin Janakābhivaṃsa, who began living there in 1914. During the 1970s, Ne Win, the country's leader, sought advice from Shwegyin monks at the monastery.

See also 
 Buddhism in Myanmar
 Monastic examinations
 Monastic schools in Myanmar

References

External links 

Monasteries in Myanmar
Religious buildings and structures completed in 1908